Regius Professor of Natural History may refer to:

 Regius Professor of Natural History (Aberdeen), at the University of Aberdeen
 Regius Professor of Natural History (Glasgow), previous title of the Regius Professor of Zoology at the University of Glasgow
 Regius Professor of Natural History, precursor to the Regius Professor of Geology at the University of Edinburgh